Luther Badger (April 10, 1785 – October 30, 1868) was an American lawyer and politician from New York.

Early life and education
Badger was born in Partridgefield, Berkshire County, Massachusetts the son of Lemuel and Sabra (Smith) Badger. In 1786, the family removed to a farm on the bank of the Susquehanna River in Harpursville, Broome County, NY. He attended Hamilton-Oneida Academy for two years but did not graduate. During his college career, he taught in the common schools.

Career 
In 1807, Badger began to study law with William Eager in Jamesville, and in 1810 entered the law office of Randall & Wattles in New Hartford. In 1811, he married Eunice Wells.  He was admitted to the bar in 1812, and practiced in Jamesville until 1824 when he retired from the bar.

Badger joined the New York State Militia as a sergeant major, was promoted to quartermaster in 1812, eventually became a brigadier general in 1819, and was judge advocate of the 27th Brigade of Infantry from 1820 to 1827 when he retired from military service.

Elected as an Adams man to the 19th United States Congress, Badger served as U.S. Representative for the twenty-third district of New York from March 4, 1825, to March 3, 1827. Afterwards, he engaged in mercantile pursuits.

In 1832, he returned to his old home in Harpursville and resumed the practice of law. He was District Attorney of Broome County from 1847 to 1849, when he resigned and resumed his private practice in Jordan, NY.

Personal life 
On August 28, 1845, he married Betsey (Dimock) Avery, sister of Davis Dimock, Jr.

Death and legacy 
Badger died on October 30, 1868, in Jordan, Onondaga County, New York; and was buried at the Jordan Cemetery.

References

External links

 
The New York Civil List compiled by Franklin Benjamin Hough (pages 71 and 370; Weed, Parsons and Co., 1858)
 Monthly Biographical Magazine edited by John Livingston (New York and London, 1852; pages 117ff, with portrait)
The New York Annual Register by Edwin Williams (New York, 1834; page 330)
The Papers of Henry Clay (Vol. 6; page 529)

1785 births
1868 deaths
People from Peru, Massachusetts
Hamilton College (New York) alumni
County district attorneys in New York (state)
People from New Hartford, New York
American militia generals
National Republican Party members of the United States House of Representatives from New York (state)
People from DeWitt, New York
People from Colesville, New York
People from Jordan, New York
19th-century American politicians
Military personnel from Massachusetts